The Bodine Farmhouse is located on Wallkill Road just outside the village of Walden in the Town of Montgomery, Orange County, New York, United States. It was added to the National Register of Historic Places in 2006.

History

The Bodine Farmstead was possibly built in 1769 by William Bodine, the grandson of Jean Bodine, but the record of his birth has not been found. The last was Hillah Terbell in about 1908.

Bodine was a distant relative of Jean Bodin, a Renaissance philosopher of France.

References

Houses on the National Register of Historic Places in New York (state)
Houses in Orange County, New York
National Register of Historic Places in Orange County, New York